El Comedor (RI #428) is a former Chicago, Rock Island and Pacific Railroad dining car, one of four built in 1947 on Lot 6762 by Pullman-Standard to plan 7517 for the Golden Rocket, "the train that never was." It was subsequently added to the consist of the Golden State along with its brethren, and stayed with the train for many years after. The car is noted for its beautiful copper interior and  Mexican theme. The hammered-copper grilles and window trim were designed by the Mexican artist Jesus Torres, of the Hull House, Chicago, Illinois. 

El Comedor  seats 48 people at 12 tables. For a number of years this car was parked in the LaSalle Street Station in Chicago where it was used as a stationary diner, serving patrons of the station. The car is now smooth-sided in stainless steel, and is in the collection of the Railway Museum of Greater Cincinnati in the Latonia area of Covington, Kentucky.

Comedor is a Spanish language word for diner or a railway dining car.

Chicago, Rock Island and Pacific Railroad
Rail passenger cars of the United States